South is a province in Guinea-Bissau.  It consists Bolama, Quinara and Tombali regions.

References 

Regions of Guinea-Bissau